Elmbridge is a local government district with borough status in Surrey, England.
Its principal towns and villages are Esher, Cobham, Walton-on-Thames, Weybridge and Molesey. It directly borders the London Borough of Richmond upon Thames and the London Royal Borough of Kingston upon Thames. Some areas of the borough form a continuation of the Greater London Built-up Area, formerly falling into the Metropolitan Police District.

History of Local Authority and politics
The borough shares a long boundary with Greater London—the London Borough of Richmond upon Thames to the north, with which the border is formed by the Thames itself, and the Royal Borough of Kingston upon Thames to the east. Running anticlockwise from the northwest, Elmbridge borders the Surrey boroughs of Spelthorne, Runnymede, Woking, Guildford and Mole Valley. Elmbridge is almost entirely within the bounds of the M25 motorway. There is only one civil parish, Claygate, while the remainder of the area has two rather than three tiers of local government. Responsibility for some designated services is with Surrey County Council, such as social services and transport.

In common with the nearby Surrey boroughs of Spelthorne and Epsom and Ewell, much of Elmbridge is a continuation of the built-up area of suburban London, and the areas of Molesey, Long Ditton, Thames Ditton, Hinchley Wood, Esher, Cobham and Claygate lie within the social and commercial orbit of neighbouring Kingston upon Thames (East Elmbridge, for example, is served by Kingston Hospital, while Molesey, Cobham, the Dittons and Claygate fell under the jurisdiction of the Metropolitan Police for more than one-hundred and sixty years). During the period of review towards a 1992 report by the Local Government Boundary Commission for England (Report No 627, 'The Boundaries of Greater London and the London Boroughs'), the Commission received a submission 'from a small London borough (Kingston upon Thames), making a case for increased size'. The final report noted Kingston's claim 'that it could define its "objective community"', while a further report of the same year (Report No 666, 'Review of Greater London, the London Boroughs and the City of London') noted Kingston's recommendation to encompass 'within its authority a wider area of Elmbridge, including Long and Thames Ditton, Hinchley Wood, Weston Green and the Moleseys'. In the light of this, and in the light of Report 627's conclusion that 'there were considerable anomalies in the boundaries, especially the outer London boundary in South West London around Kingston', the report considered 'that there was a strong case to align the boundary [of Greater London] with the edge of the built-up area, thus bringing into London boroughs parts of Surrey'. The report thus recommended 'a wider review of these boundaries in the future'.

Elmbridge is named after the Elmbridge hundred, which appears in Domesday Book of 1086 as Amelebrige.
The district was formed on 1 April 1974 following the Local Government Act 1972. The name thus derives from the river Amele or Emley (now known as the River Mole) rather than Elm trees.

Prior to 1974, the borough was split between the Esher Urban District, whose council had existed since 1933, and the Walton and Weybridge Urban District. The council's arms were created upon the formation of the present day district, being formed out of symbols taken from the local towns and villages with the Latin motto meaning until the rivers cease.  Its headquarters in Esher, the Civic Centre, opened in 1991.

Elections

Elevations, landscape and wildlife
The northern third of the borough is flatter and fertile with free draining slightly acid loamy soil, similar to the south, as described in the Surrey article.  In the next third, the first of the remarkable acid soil heaths in west Surrey begin to appear in places here , characterised by undulating heaths: these sandy and stony reliefs start in the east in the Esher Commons, covering the central swathe of the area including Oxshott Heath and Woods and areas of Weybridge and areas surrounding Wisley, a natural soil for pines, other evergreen trees as well as heather and gorse, described as naturally wet, very acid sandy and loamy soil which is just 1.9% of English soil and 0.2% of Welsh soil. Claremont Landscape Garden and Fan Court (now independent school) is on part of this elevated soil as is St George's Hill.  Most undeveloped land in Elmbridge is Metropolitan Green Belt.

The central band of forest/heath includes part of the Wisley and Ockham Commons reserve within the national wildlife trust scheme: see Surrey Wildlife Trust, several pine heath based golf courses and in the north there are reservoirs, on the side of which there is sheep grazing.

Watercourses
The Mole, passing the Grade I Church in Stoke D'Abernon, Cobham Mill at Grade II and Painshill Park and the Wey, passing Silvermere Golf Course and the Brooklands circuit, hotel and retail park, cut through the borough from south to north reaching the River Thames which denotes the northern border, stretching from Weybridge to Thames Ditton apart from inclusion of inhabited islands such as Wheatley's Ait.  The Wey and Mole have sources beyond gentle valleys which cut through the high North Downs to the south.

Settlements within the Borough
From East to West:
Long Ditton
Thames Ditton
Hinchley Wood
Claygate
Weston Green
Molesey (East Molesey)
Esher including West End and Lower Green
Oxshott
Hersham including Burwood Park
Molesey (West Molesey)
Walton on Thames including Fieldcommon and Ashley Park
Cobham  including Fairmile and the hamlets of Hatchford and Downside
Stoke D'Abernon
Weybridge including St George's Hill

Affluence and The "Grandees"

Home to some of the county's highest earners, Elmbridge is known for its varied landscapes, large average garden size, proximity to London (parts of the borough lie closer to Charing Cross than many outlying areas of Greater London) with the borough forming part of the Greater London built-up area, and an assortment of very large homes (mansions), especially in southern and western parts of the borough, such as Cobham, Oxshott, Weybridge and Esher.

This area has been labelled Britain's Beverly Hills by sections of the press. Famous residents, past and present, include Sir Cliff Richard, Mick Jagger, George Harrison, John Lennon, Ringo Starr, Ronnie Wood, Andy Murray, Kate Winslet, John Terry, Gary Lineker, Mick Hucknall, Frank Lampard, Didier Drogba, Theo Paphitis, Chris Tarrant, Peter Crouch, Michael Aspel and Shilpa Shetty.

Somewhat ironically St George's Hill, Weybridge, now a private estate for the very wealthy, was famously the site of one of the earliest experiments in common ownership of land by ordinary people. These were "The Diggers", one of the radical groups set up in the aftermath of the English Civil War and the execution of King Charles I in 1649. They seized land in the area and lived by simple farming. As well as debates about religion and how the country should be run at this time these groups complained that even the Parliamentary side in the Civil War was dominated by "Grandees" i.e. wealthy nobles who often spent their time in comfort conducting fatuous debates in Parliament while the less well off risked their lives in the war to defeat an absolutist system. They were the subject of a long campaign of harassment by a local landowner and were eventually removed in a questionable legal case. The wealthy leaders of their own side were also deeply alarmed about some of these radical ideas and also suppressed them.

Transport
The M25 motorway has several junctions nearby and the A3(M) from London bisects the borough.

The main north-south road is the A244  for instance to London Heathrow Airport and starts in the borough at Walton Bridge leading to Esher and Oxshott then to Leatherhead.  The east-west Leatherhead to Horsell, Woking road, the A245 leads by Cobham and Brooklands, Weybridge.

As to rail, the South West Main Line cuts through the borough, with four stations from Esher to Weybridge, one of which several express services call at: Walton on Thames in the Ashley Park estate of the south of the town.  The branch lines have services with four stations in the borough via Cobham & Stoke D'Abernon to Guildford; and a branch to Thames Ditton and Hampton Court railway station in East Molesey, both within Transport for London's Zone 6.

Bus services include TfL Oyster card services to East and West Molesey, Hinchley Wood, Claygate and Esher.

Cycling is very popular, with the Thames Path passing through the north of the borough and the 2012 Summer Olympics hosting both of the main road cycling events in the borough with most of the road section around Hampton Court and with the sections of the routes taken to and from Box Hill.

Economy
The economy is diverse, with a strong local service sector, including numerous bars and restaurants, homes built and being built for city workers as the majority of locations have access to one of the Home Counties fastest commutes, trades including interior supplies, fitting, gardening, golf course/landscape management and a developed public/education sector.  Of international renown are the employers Sony, Procter & Gamble, JTI (formerly Gallaher) and Toshiba Information Systems alongside the local corporate venues and day-out attractions of Sandown Park Racecourse and Mercedes-Benz World. As of 2012, Elmbridge residents had average weekly earnings of £1162.

Twinning
The Borough of Elmbridge is not twinned with any towns.  However, between 1966 and 2009 Elmbridge was formally twinned with the Paris suburb of Rueil-Malmaison, Hauts de Seine, France.

Notes

References

External links
Local Community Website
Community Facebook Group
Community Facebook Page
 Elmbridge Borough Council
 Elmbridge Guardian newspaper

 
Local authorities adjoining the River Thames
Non-metropolitan districts of Surrey
Boroughs in England